The 1995 All-Ireland Minor Hurling Championship was the 65th staging of the All-Ireland Minor Hurling Championship since its establishment by the Gaelic Athletic Association in 1928. The championship began on 29 April 1995 and ended on 3 September 1995.

Galway entered the championship as the defending champions, however, they were defeated by Cork in the All-Ireland semi-final.

On 3 September 1995, Cork won the title after defeating Kilkenny by 2-10 to 1-2 in the All-Ireland final. This was their 16th championship title overall and their first title since 1985.

Dublin's Stephen Phillips was the championship's top scorer with 2-24.

Results

Leinster Minor Hurling Championship

First round

Quarter-finals

Semi-finals

Final

Munster Minor Hurling Championship

First round

Semi-finals

Final

Ulster Minor Hurling Championship

Semi-final

Final

All-Ireland Minor Hurling Championship

Semi-finals

Final

Championship statistics

Top scorers

Top scorers overall

References

External links
 All-Ireland Minor Hurling Championship: Roll Of Honour

Minor
All-Ireland Minor Hurling Championship